General Sing Rattanasamay (1912–1973) was one of the officers who founded the Royal Lao Army (RLA). Originally a policeman, he joined the anti-Japanese resistance during World War II, and the anti-French Lao Issara from 1946 to 1949. He subsequently joined the nascent RLA, and went on to serve the Kingdom of Laos until just prior to his death in 1973.

Background
The colonial army in the French Protectorate of Laos was one of Lao recruits and French officers and non-commissioned officers. Those few Lao promoted out of the ranks rose no further than command of a company. After the Kingdom of Laos gained its freedom in 1953, the few Lao with military experience were speedily promoted to much higher command positions than they were accustomed to. Many officers were also commissioned into the upper ranks from civilian life; they tended to gain their posts through family influence rather than training or ability. The few urban elite families who dominated Lao society felt it advantageous to have family members or friends in the military command.

Early life and colonial service
Sing Rattanasamay was born in Vientiane, the French Protectorate of Laos, in 1912, and was educated there. He served originally as a non-commissioned officer in the colonial Garde Indigene (Indigenous Guard) police force in the French Protectorate of Laos prior to World War II. In October 1945, Sing joined the Lao Issara independence movement; he was given command of the civil guard in Vientiane. He was subsequently appointed as the original Lao Issara defense minister by Prince Phetsarath. However, Prince Souphanouvong claimed the post of commander-in-chief of the Lao Issara Army for the Liberation and Defense of Laos, which led to conflict with Sing. In November 1945, Sing was wounded in fighting on the Plain of Jars and sidelined to convalesce. Dissension within the Lao Issara led to Sing's dismissal in November 1948. After the Lao Issara disbanded and an amnesty declared for its participants in October 1949, Sing returned to Laos and joined the French-run Armée Nationale Laotienne (Laotian National Army) to restart his military career. In spring 1953, Captain Sing was the first Laotian appointed to battalion command. After the French cadres rotated home, Major Sing was promoted to command of Military Region 3 in early 1955.

Service for the Kingdom of Laos
His early participation in the Laotian Civil War is unknown. However, when General Phoumi Nosavan took charge of the nation in December 1959, Sing backed him. When Captain Kong Le captured the capital in his coup, Sing was there. He declared for the coup. His status in Phoumi's December 1960 counter-coup is unknown.

On 5 May 1961, Sing was entrusted as leader of a ceasefire delegation to the Pathet Lao communists. In a meeting located between Vientiane and the Plain of Jars at Ban Namone, it was agreed that the International Control Commission from the 1954 Geneva accords would be revived to police the truce. By 4 May, the ICC was arriving in Laos. During the ceasefire, the Royal Lao Government, the Pathet Lao, and the Forces Armées Neutralistes (FAN) of Kong Le would meet to negotiate terms of a coalition government.

In 1970, Sing was promoted to general, and named as military adviser to the Royal Lao Government. In 1973, he retired shortly before his death.

Notes

Bibliography
 Anthony, Victor B., and Richard R. Sexton (1993). The War in Northern Laos. Command for Air Force History. OCLC 232549943.
 
 

1912 births
1973 deaths
Laotian military personnel
People from Vientiane
People of the Laotian Civil War